Simon James Kippen (born 19 May 1992), better known by the ring name Kip Sabian, is an English professional wrestler. He is currently signed to All Elite Wrestling (AEW).

Early life
Simon James Kippen was born in Great Yarmouth on 19 May 1992.

Professional wrestling career

Early career 
Sabian began his career with the World Association of Wrestling after graduating from the promotion's wrestling school. He competed throughout England and Europe, capturing various titles including the IPW:UK World Championship and World Of Sport Wrestling Tag Team Championship. In 2018, he debuted for Ring of Honor. He also had a tag-team "Super Brotheys" with Pakistani wrestler Amir Jordan.

All Elite Wrestling (2019–present) 
In February 2019, Sabian signed with All Elite Wrestling. Sabian made his AEW debut at Double or Nothing where he defeated Sammy Guevara in AEW's first ever singles match.

In late December, Sabian established himself as a heel after calling out members of The Elite where he would face Kenny Omega on 10 December on Dark and Cody on 30 January, losing both matches. Sabian would also start to be managed by his real-life girlfriend Penelope Ford as he began feuding with Joey Janela leading up to 19 February, when he defeated Janela.

On 22 April Sabian took part in a tournament to crown the inaugural AEW TNT Champion where he lost to Dustin Rhodes in the first round.

On 15 April Sabian began teaming with Jimmy Havoc after Havoc delivered a DDT to Orange Cassidy on the floor during his match against Chuck Taylor. They made their tag team debut losing to Best Friends in a no disqualifications tag team match on the 29 April edition of Dynamite. They would subsequently call themselves The Superbad Squad. They defeated SoCal Uncensored's Frankie Kazarian and Scorpio Sky in a number one contender's match for the AEW World Tag Team Championship on 27 May. They faced the champions Kenny Omega and "Hangman" Adam Page on 3 June for the titles in a losing effort. Sabian and Havoc's team ended when Havoc was released by AEW on 13 August.

At All Out, Sabian announced that he and Ford were getting married while also teasing that he will reveal who his best man is for the wedding on the following Dynamite. On the 9 September episode of Dynamite, Miro was revealed to be the best man for Sabian and Ford's wedding. In October, Sabian and Miro began feuding with Best Friends after Trent accidentally destroyed the arcade game that Miro had purchased for Sabian as a wedding gift. This culminated in an Arcade Anarchy match on the 31 March episode of Dynamite where they were defeated. On the 28 April episode of AEW Dynamite, Miro turned on Sabian by attacking him backstage, thus ending their partnership. On 17 May Sabian underwent shoulder surgery thus rendering him out of action for several months. 

On 24 August 2022, Sabian made his return at Dynamite, as he attacked the AEW All-Atlantic Champion Pac during the main event.

Other media

Kippen is also a background character in the film Fighting With My Family, seen during multiple scenes at the WWE Performance Center.

Personal life
In April 2020, Kippen got engaged to fellow professional wrestler Olivia Hasler better known by fans as Penelope Ford. On the 23 December 2020 episode of AEW Dynamite: Holiday Bash, the couple announced that they would have a beach wedding on the 3 February 2021 episode of AEW Dynamite: Beach Break. Kippen and Hasler married on 3 February 2021.

On 20 December 2022, Kippen disclosed having ADHD on Twitter as a reply to professional wrestling news reporter Sean Ross Sapp sharing fellow professional wrestler Lacey Evans' controversial Instagram story. Kippen harshly criticized Evans who posted a controversial video on Instagram the same day claiming that processed food caused ADHD and Autism. Kippen backs up his point further tweeting (as a reply to how he deals with having ADHD as a professional wrestler) "Many years of finding coping mechanisms that work for my brain. I try to see it more as a super power with its hardships to be honest."

Championships and accomplishments
British Wrestling Revolution
BWR Cruiserweight Championship (1 time)
DDT Pro-Wrestling
Ironman Heavymetalweight Championship (1 time)
Dynamic Over-The-Top Action Wrestling
DOA UK Tag Team Championship (2 times) - with Brad Slayer (1) and Peter Nixon (1)
European Catch Tour Association
ECTA Junior Heavyweight Championship (1 time)
ECTA Tag Team Championship (1 time) - with Brad Slayer
House Of Pain: Evolution
HOPE Championship (1 time)
HOPE Kings Of Flight Championship (1 time)
International Pro Wrestling: UK
IPW:UK World Championship (1 time)
Z-Force Championship (2 times)
Pro Wrestling Chaos
Knights Of Chaos Championship (1 time) - with Martin Kirby
New Generation Wrestling
NGW Tag Team Championship (1 time) - with Iestyn Rees
Plymouth Wrestling Association
PWA Tag Team Championship (1 time) - with Brad Slayer
Pro Wrestling Chaos
Knights of Chaos Championship (1 time) - with Martin Kirby
Pro Wrestling Illustrated
Ranked No. 162 of the top 500 singles wrestlers in the PWI 500 in 2020
Reloaded Championship Wrestling Alliance
RCWA Elite-1 Championship (1 time)
Southside Wrestling Entertainment
SWE Speed King Championship (1 time)
World Association of Wrestling
WAW Open Light Heavyweight Championship (2 times)
WAW U23 Championship
WAW World Tag Team Championship (3 times) - with Brad Slayer
World Of Sport Wrestling
WOS Tag Team Championship (1 time) - with Iestyn Rees

References

External links
 
 
 

1992 births
21st-century professional wrestlers
All Elite Wrestling personnel
English male professional wrestlers
English YouTubers
Living people
People with attention deficit hyperactivity disorder
Sportspeople from Great Yarmouth
Twitch (service) streamers
Expatriate professional wrestlers